Ngaire is a self-titled debut album by New Zealand singer Ngaire Fuata. It was released in 1991.

Track listing
"Son of a Preacher Man" (John Hurley, Ronnie Wilkins)
"When The Feeling Has Gone" (Simon Lynch)
"To Sir with Love" (Don Black, Mark London)
"Make Up Your Mind" (Simon Lynch)
"Attitude" (Murray Cammick, Simon Lynch)
"I'm Naming Names" (L. White, Simon Lynch)
"Turn It Around" (Simon Lynch)
"Give Me A Chance" (Ngaire Fuata, Simon Lynch)
"Cruel Time" (L. White, Simon Lynch)
"You Got Everything" (Simon Lynch)

Personnel
Backing Vocals – Margaret Antonovich, Maryanne Antonovich
Co-producer, Guitar, Backing Vocals – Tony T Nogotautama
Engineer – Mark Tierney
Photography By – Kerry Brown
Producer, Keyboards, Drum Programming – Simon Lynch
Saxophone – Walter Bianco

References

External links
Album @ Discogs

1991 debut albums
Ngaire Fuata albums